Dauphin—Swan River—Neepawa is a federal electoral district in Manitoba. It encompasses a portion of Manitoba previously included in the electoral districts of Dauphin—Swan River—Marquette, Brandon—Souris and Portage—Lisgar.

Dauphin—Swan River—Neepawa was created by the 2012 federal electoral boundaries redistribution and was legally defined in the 2013 representation order. It came into effect upon the call of the 42nd Canadian federal election, which was held on 19 October 2015.

Demographics
According to the Canada 2011 Census

Ethnic groups: 73.6% White, 24.7% Aboriginal
Languages: 83.5% English, 5.3% German, 3.7% Ukrainian, 2.3% Ojibway, 2.1% French
Religions: 72.0% Christian (24.4% Catholic, 20.5% United Church, 5.1% Anglican, 3.2% Lutheran, 1.9% Pentecostal, 1.9% Baptist, 1.7% Christian Orthodox, 1.2% Presbyterian, 12.3% Other), 1.9% Traditional Aboriginal Spirituality, 25.4% No religion 
Median income (2010): $23,271 
Average income (2010): $30,399

Riding associations

Riding associations are the local branches of the national political parties:

Members of Parliament

This riding has elected the following members of the House of Commons of Canada:

Election results

References

Manitoba federal electoral districts
Dauphin, Manitoba